Otis is a town in Berkshire County, Massachusetts, United States. It is part of the Pittsfield, Massachusetts Metropolitan Statistical Area. The population was 1,634 at the 2020 census.

History 

Officially incorporated in 1810, the town was created when the unincorporated town of Loudon annexed the adjacent District of Bethlehem in 1809. It was named after Harrison Gray Otis, an influential lawyer, financier, and politician in revolutionary Massachusetts. General Henry Knox passed through the town in January 1776, bringing cannons from Fort Ticonderoga in New York to aid in ending the Siege of Boston, a route now known as the Knox Trail. The town was a farming community, with several small mill industries growing along the waterways, and today is mostly rural with some tourism.

Geography

Otis lies along the eastern border of Berkshire County with Hampden County, bordered by Becket to the north, Blandford to the east, Tolland to the southeast, Sandisfield to the south, and Monterey and Tyringham to the west.

Otis lies in the southern end of the Berkshire Mountains, and is dotted by several hills. The West Branch of the Farmington River rises in the town, heading southward towards the Connecticut River. The southeastern part of town is dominated by the Otis Reservoir and Big Pond, as well as portions of Tolland State Forest and Otis State Forest. The highest points in the town are to the north, with Church Hill to the east and Kingsbury Mountain to the west. Much of the land around the brooks of town is marshy. Just west of the town center is Otis Ridge Ski Area. Most of the population is around the reservoir and the center of town.

Otis lies at the intersection of Massachusetts Route 8 and Route 23. Route 8 was once part of the New England interstate system, as the Stratford-Waterbury-North Adams Route. Route 23 is known as the Knox Trail, with a historical marker along the route in the eastern part of town. Interstate 90 (the Massachusetts Turnpike) passes through the northern edge of town twice, with the nearest exit being in Lee. There is no rail, bus or air service in town, with the nearest being in Pittsfield and Westfield. The nearest national air service is at Bradley International Airport in Windsor Locks, Connecticut.

Climate

In a typical year, Otis, Massachusetts temperatures fall below 50F° for 205 days per year. Annual precipitation is typically 48 inches per year (the highest in the US) and snow covers the ground 69 days per year or 18.9% of the year (high in the US). It may be helpful to understand the yearly precipitation by imagining 10 straight days of moderate rain per year. The humidity is below 60% for approximately 18.4 days or 5% of the year.

Demographics

As of the census of 2000, there were 1,365 people, 567 households, and 386 families residing in the town. By population, Otis ranks 19th out of the 32 cities and towns in Berkshire County, and 312th out of 351 cities and towns in Massachusetts. The racial makeup of the town was 96.56% White, 0.59% African American, 0.29% Native American, 0.88% Asian, 0.37% from other races, and 1.32% from two or more races. Hispanic or Latino of any race were 0.29% of the population.

There were 567 households, out of which 26.6% had children under the age of 18 living with them, 59.1% were married couples living together, 5.5% had a female householder with no husband present, and 31.9% were non-families. Of all households, 24.3% were made up of individuals, and 7.6% had someone living alone who was 65 years of age or older.  The average household size was 2.40 and the average family size was 2.90.

In the town, the population was spread out, with 21.8% under the age of 18, 5.7% from 18 to 24, 28.1% from 25 to 44, 30.3% from 45 to 64, and 14.1% who were 65 years of age or older.  The median age was 42 years. For every 100 females, there were 111.6 males.  For every 100 females age 18 and over, there were 108.2 males.

The median income for a household in the town was $51,488, and the median income for a family was $55,455. Males had a median income of $41,065 versus $30,179 for females. The per capita income for the town was $25,029.  About 4.6% of families and 7.4% of the population were below the poverty line, including 11.4% of those under age 18 and 4.2% of those age 65 or over.

Government
Otis uses the open town meeting form of government, and is led by a board of selectmen and an administrative assistant. The current Board of Selectmen consists of Bill Hiller, Larry Southard, and Gary Thomas. All four of the town's main offices, including the town hall, police and fire departments and the town library, are located at the center of town, as is the central post office. A second post office is located in East Otis. The library is a part of the regional library systems.

On the state level, Otis is represented in the Massachusetts House of Representatives by the Fourth Berkshire district, which covers southern Berkshire County, as well as the westernmost towns in Hampden County. In the Massachusetts Senate, the town is represented by the Berkshire, Hampshire and Franklin district, which includes all of Berkshire County and western Hampshire and Franklin counties. The town is patrolled by the Otis Police Department, as well as the First (Lee) Station of Barracks "B" of the Massachusetts State Police. Kris McDonough serves as the Chief of Police and Director of Emergency Management for the town. Richard Phair serves as the Fire Chief.

On the national level, Otis is represented in the United States House of Representatives as part of Massachusetts's 1st congressional district, and has been represented by Democrat Richard Neal of Springfield, Massachusetts since January, 2013. Massachusetts is currently represented in the United States Senate by senior senator Elizabeth Warren and junior senator Ed Markey, both Democrats as well.

Education
Otis, along with neighboring Sandisfield, Tolland and Becket, is part of the Farmington River Regional School District. The district's only school, Farmington River Elementary School, houses students from pre-kindergarten through sixth grades. For the upper grades, most students attend either (1) Great Barrington-based Monument Valley Regional Middle School and Monument Mountain Regional High School or (2) Lee Middle/High School. Proximity to private schools located in Lenox, Great Barrington, or Westfield allow alternatives to public school.

The nearest community college is Berkshire Community College in Pittsfield and Great Barrington. The nearest state college is Westfield State University. The nearest private college is Bard College at Simon's Rock in Great Barrington, with other private colleges in Springfield.

Cultural references
The song "Otis" by Medeski, Martin & Wood is named after Otis. In an interview with Marian McPartland in 2005, John Medeski states, "the tune kinda reflects the place and friends I have out there...something about it."

References

External links

 Town of Otis official website

 
Towns in Berkshire County, Massachusetts
Towns in Massachusetts